In taxonomy, Stappia is a genus of the Hyphomicrobiales. Some members of the genus (now transferred to Labrenzia) oxidize carbon monoxide (CO) aerobically.
Stappia indica is a diatom associated bacterium which is known to inhibit the growth of diatoms such as Thalassiosira pseudonana.

References

Further reading

Scientific journals

Scientific books

Scientific databases

External links

Bacteria genera
Hyphomicrobiales